Joseph Walton (8 January 1881 – 1962) was an English professional footballer who played for Preston North End, Tottenham Hotspur, Sheffield United and Stalybridge Celtic.

Football career 
Walton began his career at Preston North End, between 1901-02 he made 25 League appearances and scored four goals. The outside right joined Tottenham Hotspur in 1908 where he played in a further 28 matches and scored on two occasions in all competitions. Walton signed for Sheffield United in 1909 and went on to score five goals in 60 League matches. After leaving Bramall Lane he joined Stalybridge Celtic where he ended his senior career.

References 

1881 births
1962 deaths
Sportspeople from Morecambe
English footballers
English Football League players
Preston North End F.C. players
Tottenham Hotspur F.C. players
Sheffield United F.C. players
Stalybridge Celtic F.C. players
Date of death missing
Association football outside forwards